Sokolniki is a Moscow Metro station in the Sokolniki District, Eastern Administrative Okrug, Moscow. It is on the Sokolnicheskaya Line, between Krasnoselskaya and Preobrazhenskaya Ploshchad stations. It is located under Rusakovskaya street at the foot of Sokolnicheskaya Square and was part of the first Metro line. The station is named after the nearby Sokolniki Park.
By 2023, the station will be open as part of the Bolshaya Koltsevaya line with name Sokolniki.

History
The northeastern end of the line, including Sokolniki, was built using the cut and cover method. The tunnels from Krasnoselskaya to Sokolniki were under construction as early as the summer of 1933, but work did not begin on the station itself until March 1934. The concrete shell of the station was completed in just five months, and Sokolniki opened along with the rest of the line on 15 May 1935. The first test run of the Metro took place in 1934 between Sokolniki and Komsomolskaya stations.

Sokolniki was the eastern terminus of the line for 30 years until the 1965 extension to Preobrazhenskaya Ploshchad was completed. The reversal sidings are still used for maintenance and overnight storage of trains.

Design

The station was designed by architects Ivan Taranov and Nadezhda Bykova and features tiled walls and pillars faced with grey-blue Ufaley marble. A model of the station was awarded a Grand Prix at the 1937 Paris World's Fair.

References

Moscow Metro stations
Railway stations in Russia opened in 1935
Sokolnicheskaya Line
Railway stations located underground in Russia